Syakilla Salni  Jefry Krisnan (born 21 June 1992) is a Malaysian karateka. She was the gold medallist in the −61 kg category at the 2014 Asian Games.

Achievements

References

External links
WKF CURRENT RANKING - COMPETITORS

1992 births
Living people
People from Selangor
Malaysian female karateka
Asian Games gold medalists for Malaysia
Asian Games medalists in karate
Karateka at the 2014 Asian Games
Karateka at the 2018 Asian Games
Medalists at the 2014 Asian Games
Southeast Asian Games silver medalists for Malaysia
Southeast Asian Games bronze medalists for Malaysia
Southeast Asian Games gold medalists for Malaysia
Southeast Asian Games medalists in karate
Competitors at the 2011 Southeast Asian Games
21st-century Malaysian women